Aspen Butte is a steep-sided shield volcano in the Cascade Range of southern Oregon. Ice Age glaciers carved three large cirques into the north and northeast flanks of the mountain removing most of the original summit area including any evidence of a crater. The summit is now the high point along the curving ridge which bounds the southern edge of the cirques above steep cliffs.

Aspen Butte is the highest of four overlapping shield volcanoes within the Mountain Lakes Wilderness all of which have been carved to varying degrees by glaciers. The other volcanoes are  Mount Harriman,  Crater Mountain and  Greylock Mountain. Little Aspen Butte, a  satellite cone, rises on the southern flanks of the main volcano separated from it by a  pass.

References 

Sources

External links 
 

Buttes of Oregon
Shield volcanoes of the United States
Subduction volcanoes
Cascade Volcanoes
Volcanoes of Oregon
Mountains of Oregon
Landmarks in Oregon
Cascade Range
Volcanoes of Klamath County, Oregon
Mountains of Klamath County, Oregon
Fremont–Winema National Forest